Ochodontia is a genus of moths in the family Geometridae described by Julius Lederer in 1853.

References

Rhodometrini